A hosh, or hawsh, is a courtyard in some traditional residential complexes in the Arab world. It represents the center of the housing structure.

References

Courtyards
Islamic architecture
Islamic architectural elements
Arabic architecture
Ottoman architecture
House types
Architecture in Syria
Architecture in the State of Palestine
Architecture in Lebanon